San Juan Hill is a series of hills to the east of Santiago, Cuba, running north to south. The area is known as the San Juan Heights or in Spanish Alturas de San Juan before the Spanish–American War of 1898, and are now part of Lomas de San Juan.

Overview
This area was the site of the Battle of San Juan Hill during the Spanish–American War. The Americans named the lesser heights "Kettle Hill" and the higher southern hill "San Juan Hill" after the battle of July 2, 1898. The two high points or hills are connected by a draw or saddle on a north–south axis.

The fight for the San Juan Heights or Hills became known as the Battle of San Juan Hill due to a reporter's telegraphy error in which the plural "s" was dropped.  American Army reports also referred to the heights as "hills". 

On January 12, 1959, in this place, 72 prisoners accused of crimes during the dictatorship of Fulgencio Batista were shot by order of the commander of the Cuban Revolution Raúl Castro. The defendants did not have a trial with guarantees, and before this, they had been sentenced to death. They were buried in a 40-meter-long mass grave at the site. This event is known as the San Juan Hill Massacre.

See also
 El Caney

References

Hills of Cuba
Santiago de Cuba
Geography of Santiago de Cuba Province